The Women's 200m athletics events for the 2016 Summer Paralympics take place at the Estádio Olímpico João Havelange from September 8 to September 17, 2016. A total of 6 events were contested over this distance for 8 different classifications.

Schedule

Medal summary

Results

The following were the results of the finals of each of the women's 200 metres events in each of the classifications. Further details of each event are available on that event's dedicated page.

T11

19:42 13 September 2016:

T12

10:57 12 September 2016:

T35

11:13 17 September 2016:

T36

10:50 13 September 2016:

T44

17:45 15 September 2016:

T47

References

Athletics at the 2016 Summer Paralympics